National Colon Cancer Awareness Month is an annual celebration observed in the United States during the month of March, to increase awareness of colorectal cancer. In the United States it is organized by the Colorectal Cancer Alliance, Fight Colorectal Cancer, the Colon Cancer Coalition, and numerous other organizations and survivor networks.

History 

National Colon Cancer Awareness Month (or National Colorectal Cancer Awareness Month) in the United States was first established via Presidential Proclamation, signed by William Jefferson Clinton on February 29, 2000.

Events
A National Colorectal Cancer Awareness Month proclamation was issued by President Barack Obama for three years between 2014 and 2016.

The manner of celebration for national colon cancer awareness month varies, but many organizations host special events to help engage their local communities in raising awareness, such as with the Dress in Blue Day promoted by the Colorectal Cancer Alliance, Blue for CRC by the Colon Cancer Coalition, and Call on Congress by Fight Colorectal Cancer .

References

External links
National Colon Cancer Awareness Month
Colorectal Cancer Awareness
Colorectal Cancer Awareness Month Toolkit 

March observances
Observances in the United States
Colorectal cancer
Awareness months
Health observances